The following is a list of works published by Kodansha and its subsidiaries, such as mangas published by foreign subsidiaries, books, novels and light novels, and others, listed by release date.

Including titles from:
Kodansha
Kobunsha
Seikaisha
Scola (1981-2001)
King Records
Starchild Records
Vertical
ASK-Kodansha (1981-1998)
Asmik Ace Entertainment (1985-1995)
Del Rey Manga
Kodansha International
Kodansha Globe
Kodansha Amer
Kodansha Europe

1920s

1921
A Dark Night's Passing

1930s

1933
Daitō no Tetsujin

1936
The Fiend with Twenty Faces

1937
Shōnen Tanteidan

1940s

1947
The Bells of Nagasaki

1950s

1951
The Chinese Maze Murders

1955
Flying Saucer from Mars
Windows to the Sun and Moon

1957
Shōden Shinkage-ryū

1958
Nip the Buds, Shoot the Kids

1959
Fukurō no Shiro

1960s

1960
Star

1963
The Sailor Who Fell from Grace with the Sea

1965
Bunraku: The Art of the Japanese Puppet Theatre

1966
Atama no Taisou
The Doctor's Wife
Masonry in Japan: The First One Hundred Years, 1866-1966
My Forsaken Star

1967
Modern Japanese Painting: An Art in Transition

1968
Hana no techō: No no hana
Nagasaki Kyoryūchi: Hitotsu no Nihon Kindaishi
Sun and Steel

1969
Comprehensive Asian Fighting Arts

1970s

1971
The Anatomy of Dependence
Nihon no kaboku
The Southern barbarians : the first Europeans in Japan

1972
44 Modern Japanese Print Artists
Court Transcript of the Yukio Mishima Incident
Papelucho
Steam Locomotives of Japan

1973
Japan Sinks
Karate-Do Kyohan: The Master Text
Psychic School Wars
This Island of Japon: Joao Rodrigues’s Account of 16th Century Japan

1974
A Haiku Journey
The Lake
Nihongo no kokoro
Tsutsuji, satsuki, shakunage

1975
Karate-Do: My Way of Life
The Twenty Guiding Principles of Karate: The Spiritual Legacy of the Master
War-Wasted Asia: letters, 1945–46
Yōseiden

1976
Almost Transparent Blue
Chiteki seikatsu no hōhō

1977
「Nihonrashisa」no kōzō
Dynamic Aikido

1978
Best Karate, Vol. 3: Kumite 1
Best Karate, Vol 4: Kumite 2
Japanese Film Directors
Landscapes and Portraits: Appreciations of Japanese culture
Nihon-den Jujutsu
Some Japanese Portraits

1979
Hear the Wind Sing
Papilionidae and their early stages
The Reluctant Admiral
Wonder of the World's Dinosaurs
Zoku-Chiteki seikatsu no hōhō

1980s

1980
Coin Locker Babies
Japonisme in Art, Art Symposium
On a Certain, Fine Day, Stands Wien in the Forest
Pinball, 1973

1981
Biographical Dictionary of Japanese
The Devil's Gluttony
Karate-do: My Way of Life
Sanshouo
Stick Fighting
Totto-Chan: The Little Girl at the Window

1982
Currents in Japanese Cinema
The Faust Age
Ideals of the Samurai: Writings of Japanese Warriors
Smaller Is Better, Japan's Mastery of the Miniature
Utamaro: Portraits from the Floating World
A Wild Sheep Chase

1983
Daijiten Desuku
Hayao Miyazaki's Image Board Collection
The Japanese sword
Kiseto and Setoguro (Famous Ceramics of Japan)
Kodansha Encyclopedia of Japan
Manga! Manga! The World of Japanese Comics
Nanako My Love: Azuma Hideo Illust Book
Nihon no Budō Vol.11
The Strange Library

1984
Banjos: The Tsumura Collection
Midnight Suite
The Spirit of Aikido
The Textbook of Modern Karate
There Was a Knock

1985
The Haiku Handbook
Leda: The Fantastic Adventure of Yohko
Man'yōshū Jiten
Murder affair of the Yoshitsune's Buried Treasure Legend
Nyokan Tūkai
Three Sisters Investigate

1986
Bico's
The Capricious Robot
Japanese Castles

1987
69
Bedtime Tales
Koi o Kazoete
Miracle Ropitt: 2100-Nen no Daibōken
Norwegian Wood
Super Boy Allan

1988
Gambler Jiko Chuushinha
Hiking in Japan: An Adventurer's Guide to the Mountain Trails
Hoshin Engi
Inside the Robot Kingdom
Karate-Do Nyumon: The Master Introductory Text
Make Your Own Japanese Clothes: Patterns and Ideas for Modern Wear
Onna ni tsuite
A Reader's Guide to Japanese Literature
Toyota - Fifty Years in Motion
Visions of the Tranquility of Mount Huangshan

1989
Akuryō Series
The Bag of Surprises
Can't Sleep on Birthday Eve
Cosmic Epsilon
Evil Spirits Aren't Scary
Evil Spirit Series
Introducing Kyoto
The Japanese Negotiator: Subtlety and Strategy Beyond Western Logic
Jesus: Kyōfu no Bio Monster
Meimon! Tako Nishiouendan
Mephisto and Waltz!
Nihongo Daijiten
Shinobi
A Stranger in Tibet
Teke! Teke! Asmik-kun World

1990s

1990
Air Diver
Conquest of the Crystal Palace
Cutie Suzuki no Ringside Angel
Deep Dungeon IV: The Black Sorcerer
F1 Boy
Gambler Jiko Chuushinha
Jumpin' Kid: Jack to Mame no Ki Monogatari
Necros no Yōsai
Nippon Ichi no Nakantoku
Power Drift
Top Players' Tennis

1991
The Adventures of Star Saver
Akagawa Jirou no Yuurei Ressha
Appreciations of Japanese Culture
Asmik-kun Land
Asmik-kun World 2
Blue Almanac
Confessions of a Yakuza
D-Force
Hard-Boiled Wonderland and the End of the World
Hōtō-ki
Ippatsu Gyakuten: DX Bakenou
Megalit
Mikineko Holmes no Kishi Michi
Monster Pro Wrestling
Mysterium
Ransei no Hasha
Verytex
Wurm: Journey to the Center of the Earth
Yellow Cab: The women who took off at Narita

1992
"Adult" People
DX Bakenou Z
The Great Game
Lennus: Kodai Kikai no Kioku
Shanghai III: Dragon's Eye
Sougou Kakutougi: Astral Bout
South of the Border, West of the Sun
Taiko: An Epic Novel of War and Glory in Feudal Japan
The Twelve Kingdoms
Winds from Afar
Working For A Japanese Company: Insights Into The Multicultural Workplace
Xardion

1993
1552: Tenka Tairan
Aah! Harimanada
Alien vs. Predator
Bakenou V3
CD Battle: Hikari no Yūshatachi
F-15 Super Strike Eagle
Fragments of a Past: A Memoir
Having Our Say: The Delany Sisters' First 100 Years
A History of the Devil
Hope Dies Last
Japan, An Illustrated Encyclopedia
Kessen! Dokapon Okukoku IV: Densetsu no Yuusha Tachi
Kishi Densetsu
Koutetsu no Kishi
Maten no Sōmetsu
The Shin Daijiten
Stepfather Step
Super Air Diver
Super Kyousouba: Kaze no Sylphid
Verve of Mt. Huangshan

1994
American Night
Artistic Interpretation of the Huangshan Mountain
Bakenou TV '94
Battle Zeque Den
Big Ichigeki! Pachi-Slot Daikouryaku
Dance Dance Dance
Derby Jockey: Kishu Ou heno Michi
Dokapon 3-2-1: Arashi wo Yobu Yujo
Ghost Hunt
Koutetsu no Kishi 2: Sabaku no Rommel Shougun
Lean and Clean Management: How to Boost Profits and Productivity by Reducing Pollution
Like hidden fire. The Plot to bring down the British Empire
Man Meets Dog
The Memory Police
On Familiar Terms: A Journey Across Cultures
Once and Forever: The Tales of Kenji Miyazawa
Pretty Soldier Sailor Moon Original Picture Collection vol. I
Pretty Soldier Sailor Moon Volume II Original Picture Collection
Sons of the Yellow Emperor: A History of the Chinese Diaspora
Sougou Kakutougi: Astral Bout 2 - The Total Fighters
The Summer of the Ubume
Women who slept with the bubble
Zen in America: Profiles of Five Teachers

1995
17 Springs Passed
The ABC Wars
A Cruel Angel's Thesis
Ghost in the Shell: Burning City
Gon, the Little Fox
Idol Mahjong Final Romance 2
Mōryō no Hako
Mrs. Ohnishi's Whale Cuisine
The National Parks of Japan
Sougou Kakutougi Rings: Astral Bout 3
Trespassers on the Roof of the World: The Secret Exploration of Tibet

1996
All She Was Worth
Big Ichigeki! Pachi-Slot Daikouryaku: Universal Museum
Enhance Your Garden with Japanese Plants
Fishing Koushien
The Haiku Seasons: Poetry of the Natural World
Haiku World: An International Poetry Almanac\
Idol Mahjong Final Romance R
The Narrow Road to Oku
On Familiar Terms: To Japan and Back, a Lifetime Across Cultures
One Life: The Autobiography of an African American Actress
Philosophy for Kids!
Pretty Soldier Sailor Moon Volume III Original Picture Collection
Pretty Soldier Sailor Moon Volume IV Original Picture Collection
Reading The Japanese Mind: The Realities Behind Their Thoughts and Actions
Sakuraba Atsuko: Kakeru kita Megami
Syusse Mahjong Daisettai
Yanoáma: the story of Helena Valero, a girl kidnapped by Amazonian Indians
Yume de Ippai

1997
Analysis of Ghost in the Shell
Asuka 120% Limited BURNING Fest
Bakuretsu Hunter R
in the room
The Evening Party at the Princess's House
Home, Green Home
Kendo The definitive guide
Niagara: A History of the Falls. New York
Pretty Soldier Sailor Moon Volume V Original Picture Collection
The Roads to Sata
Rondo-Revolution
A Lost Paradise
Ukiyo-e: An Introduction to Japanese Woodblock Prints
Underground
Voice Fantasia S: Ushinawareta Voice Power

1998
The connoisseur's book of Japanese swords
The garden as architecture : form and spirit in the gardens of Japan, China, and Korea
Ghost in the Shell 2: Star Seed
Initial D Gaiden
Kurashi no kotoba: Gogen Jiten
Mario Mushano no Chou-Shogi-Juku	
One Hundred Sacks of Rice: A Stage Play
The Scents of Eden: A History of the Spice Trade
Shura no Mon
Tsun Tsun Kumi: Suuji de Puni Puni
Tsun Tsun Kumi 2: Moji Moji Pakkun
Yakushiji Ryōko no Kaiki Jikenbo

1999
Initial D
Initial D: Koudou Saisoku Densetsu
Kiganjo
Kindaichi Shounen no Jikenbo 3: Shouryuu Densetsu Satsujin Jiken
Kodansha Kanji Learner's Dictionary
Living in Two Countries
Mizuki Shigeru no Youkai Zukan Soushuuhen
Pikupiku Sentarou
Prety Soldier Sailor Moon Materials Collection
Psychometrer Eiji
Sougaku Toshi Osaka
South Africa: A Narrative History
Sputnik Sweetheart
Super Bass Fishing
This Cruel World
Tsun Tsun Kumi 3: Kanjivader

2000s

2000
Bonkura
The Colors of Japan
Dejiko no Mahjong Party
Dive!!
Go
Jiken
Jump
Mizutamari ni Utsuru Sekai
Tobaku Mokushiroku Kaiji
Traditional Japanese Music and Musical Instruments
Tsutsui-ban akuma no jiten
Utamaro: Portraits from the Floating World

2001
Cat Soup
Dai Tsui Seki-Einstein No Tensai No
Drunk as a Lord
A Hundred Years of Japanese Film: A Concise History
Kagami family series
Karate Jutsu: The Original Teachings of Master Funakoshi
Kuroneko to Tsuki Kikyū o Meguru Bōken
Naniwa Kinyuu Michi
Shaman King
Spain no Ame
The Tale of Genji

2002
China Impact
Christmas Terror—Invisible/Inventor
Dead or Alive 3 Kōshiki Kōryaku Guide
The fine art of Japanese food arrangement
Giants of Japan: The Lives of Japan's Most Influential Men and Women
A Haiku Journey: Bashō's Narrow Road to a Far Province
Horie Yui no Tenshi no Tamago
Japan's Longest Day
Modern Japanese Swords and Swordsmiths: From 1866 to the Present
 The New Generation of Japanese Swordsmiths
Riding the East Wind: A Novel of War and Peace
Tsutsui-ban akuma no jiten : kanzen hochū
Zaregoto

2003
Basic Wakiya-style Chinese You Can Make in a Frying Pan
Classical Weaponry of Japan: Special Weapons and Tactics of the Martial Arts
Discovering the Arts of Japan, A Historical Overview
Edo no hatamoto jiten
Guin Saga
Ho?: Horie Yui Character Best Album
How to make The Character Novels
Kura no Kami
No. 6
Okko's Inn
Ring
Samurai Fighting Arts: The Spirit and the Practice
Sekai
Shin Honkaku Mahō Shōjo Risuka
Sky

2004
After Dark
Alive & Kicking
Ashita no Kioku
Children Killed by Information Technology: Spreading Game Brain
Clamp no Kiseki
The Canon of Judo
Dark Water
The Garden of Sinners
A Guide to the Japanese Stage.
Innocent Starter
The Intellectual History of Otaku ―― 1980's Theory
The Japan Book: A Comprehensive Pocket Guide
Ico
The Lone Samurai
Magical Girl Lyrical Nanoha Sound Stage 01
Mottainai Bāsan
Rakuen
Spiral
Ningen

2005
Chūsei Toshi Kamakura: Iseki ga Kataru Bushi no Miyako
Eternal Blaze
Floating Yesterday
Grand Finale
Higurashi
A Hundred Years of Japanese Film: A Concise History, with a Selective Guide to DVDs and Videos
Kuromajo-san ga Toru!!
Magical Girl Lyrical Nanoha A's Sound Stage 01
Magical Girl Lyrical Nanoha Original Soundtrack
Magical Girl Lyrical Nanoha Sound Stage 02
Magical Girl Lyrical Nanoha Sound Stage 03
Monogatari
Parasite Eve
The Secret Techniques of Bonsai
Shadow Family
Spiritual Garden
Usotsuki Alice to Kujiragō o Meguru Bōken

2006
Adventures in the Japanese Bath
The Beast Player
Birthday
The Book of Sake: A Connoisseurs Guide
The Crimson Labyrinth
Crossfire
The Demon's Sermon on the Martial Arts
The Flowering Spirit: Classic Teachings on the Art of No
The Hunter
Loving the Machine: The Art and Science of Japanese Robots
Magical Girl Lyrical Nanoha A's original soundtracks
Magical Girl Lyrical Nanoha A's Sound Stage 02
Magical Girl Lyrical Nanoha A's Sound Stage 03
Magical Girl Lyrical Nanoha A's Sound Stage Vocal Best Collection
Plastic Culture: How Japanese Toys Conquered the World
Plastic Soul
Super Generation

2007
Ari no susabi
Beautiful Amulet
The Devil's Whisper
Gōin ni Mai Yeah
Gray-Colored Diet Coke
The Guin Saga Manga: The Seven Magi
Higurashi When They Cry
History of the University of Tokyo: Forerunner of the University System
Hito Toshite Jiku ga Bureteiru
Hoshizora no Spica
Japanese Cooking: A Simple Art
Kanojo ni Tsuite Shiru koto no Subete
Katanagatari
Magical Girl Lyrical Nanoha StrikerS Sound Stage 01
Massive Wonders
My Ego Ratio, My Teeth, and the World
Otome wa Boku ni Koishiteru
Sayonara, Zetsubou-Sensei Character Song Album
Sayonara, Zetsubou-Sensei Original Soundtrack
Secret Ambition
Toward the Terra
Zessei Bijin

2008
Arcade Mania! The Turbo-Charged World of Japan's Games Centers
Chotto Nani Kai ten no ka wakan naidesu……!!
Darling
Genshiken: Return of the Otaku
Haute Chinese Cuisine from the Kitchen of Wakiya
Kitchen Princess: Search for the Angel Cake
Kūsō Rumba
Megumi Ohori×Mōsatsu Amai Kokansetsu
Research on the Sōkagakkai
Sayonara, Zetsubou-Sensei Best Album: Zetsubō Daisakkai
Yokai Attack! : the Japanese Monster Survival Guide
Yōkaiden
Zoku Sayonara, Zetsubou-Sensei Original Soundtrack

2009
Buta o Nusumu
Death by Water
Heaven
Honey Jet
Magical Girl Lyrical Nanoha StrikerS Sound Stage Vocal Best Collection
Megatokyo
Minoue Banashi
The Otaku Encyclopedia
Railways of Japan - Tokaido Line - Lines/Stations/Track plans - Vol 11 South-east Tokyo and North-west Chiba
Ringo Mogire Beam!
The Sleeping Dragon
Wolverine: Prodigal Son
X-Men Misfits
Yojokun: Life Lessons from a Samurai
Zan Sayonara, Zetsubou-Sensei Character Song
Zan Sayonara, Zetsubou-Sensei Original Soundtrack

2010s

2010
Bushido, The Soul of Japan
The Essence of Karate
King of RPGs
Kogure shashinkan
Kyokugen Dasshutsu 9 Jikan 9 Nin 9 no Tobira Alterna
Nihon jinmei daijiten
Nintendo Magic: Winning the Videogame Wars
Pistols
Perfect Guide Book of the Japanese Riot Police
Shuchō Panchi: Sainenshō Shichō GABBA Funsenki
Twin Spica
Yosuga no Sora

2011
All the Lovers in the Night
Aruvu Rezuru: Kikaijikake no Yōseitachi
Attack on Titan: Before the Fall
Dance Hall
The Kouga Ninja Scrolls
Lychee Light Club
Nihon jinmei daijiten+Plus
No Longer Human
Ojamajo Doremi
Tantei Team KZ Jiken Note
Velveteen & Mandala

2012
Best Album
Devil Survivor 2 The Animation: Cetus's Prequel
The Essence of Shinto: Japan's Spiritual Heart
Heroman
Himitsu
Listen to Me, Girls. I Am Your Father!
Magical Girl Lyrical Nanoha The Movie 2nd A's Original Soundtrack
Ninjin Club
Nocturne for the Starry Sky
Paradise Kiss
Queen's Blade: Perfect Visual Book
Unknown Arve: Kindan no Yōseitachi

2013
Clockwork Planet
Dreams of Love, etc.
Helter Skelter
Kurage no Shokudō
Mobile Suit Gundam: The Origin
Sickness Unto Death
Summer Wars

2014
Attack on Titan: Harsh Mistress of the City
Attack on Titan: Lost Girls
Brainwash ~Comeback from 12 Years of Hell~
Cardfight!! Vanguard
How Not to Summon a Demon Lord
In Clothes Called Fat
Prophecy
~Umaretate no Watashi~ Tomohide Monogatari Jiyoung Story

2015
Babylon
Hajime Syacho Photo Book
Nihon Jinmei Daijiten Plus
Nihon no Rock Meiban Best 100
Ninja Slayer
Pretty Boy Detective Club
Rune Naito Artbox: The Roots of Kawaii
Tokyo ESP#Manga
World End no Niwa

2016
A Girl on the Shore
Hajime Syacho Photo Book -Sotsugyō-
Immortal Hounds
Nichijou
Tomonaga Mio First Photobook "Hinata"
Yagi Magazine

2017
Arakawa Under the Bridge
Boarding School Juliet
Burn the House Down
Crystal
Go! Princess PreCure the Book: Hana and Refi's Adventure
Middle-Aged Businessman, Arise in Another World!
Mobile Suit Gundam Wing Endless Waltz: Glory of the Losers
My Unique Skill Makes Me OP Even at Level 1

2018
Am I Actually the Strongest?
Against decriminalization: The perspectives on humanity in the early Buddhism and the Lotus sutra.
Azur Lane: Starting My Life as a Commander with Laffey
A Girl & Her Guard Dog
Pop Team Epic

2019
Bungaku Shojo no Kashu
Raging Loop

2020s

2020
I Was Reincarnated as the 7th Prince so I Can Take My Time Perfecting My Magical Ability

Unsorted
Altered Beast
Ben 10: Alien Force: Doom Dimension
Blueprint for a New Japan: The Rethinking of a Nation
The Craft of the Japanese Sword
Daily Lives of High School Boys
DuckTales
Eiji Yoshikawa's Historical Fiction in Paperback
Elfin Paradise
Turkestan Reunion

See also
List of manga published by Kodansha
List of works published by Ichijinsha

Kodansha